Brake is a charity that operates internationally from its bases in the UK and New Zealand. It was established in 1995. It coordinates Road Safety Week, provides support services for people bereaved and injured in road crashes and the professionals who care for them, including the emergency services. Its head office is based in the UK.

History
Brake was formed in 1995 by former transport journalist Mary Williams OBE. Mary Williams formed Brake with the aims of victim support and preventing road deaths and injuries through campaigns that were both community and policy oriented. Mary Williams was awarded the OBE for her services to road safety in 2000.

Functions
The charity aims to promote awareness of road safety issues and care for road crash victims through a number of different services and campaigns. It founded and runs an annual road safety week and has various award schemes such as awarding UK Members of Parliament for services to road safety. It runs international conferences on key topics such as speeding and impaired driving. It has services for schools and pre-school organisations and runs a record-breaking Giant Walking Bus annually to campaign for community road safety.

It provides services for suddenly bereaved people, including helplines and online literature.

Brake invites participation worldwide, and has many supporters worldwide in communities, companies (particularly those interested in managing their road risk through operation of fleets), emergency services, schools and all other sectors of society.

Initiatives
In September 2014, Brake has organized online webinar for European countries focused on engaging way to get life-saving road safety messages out to the public and help to prevent road death and injury.

See also
 RoSPA
 Think! - DfT's road safety campaign
 IAM RoadSmart - Road safety charity

References

External links
 

Charities based in West Yorkshire
Organizations established in 1995
Road safety in the United Kingdom